Holly Bodimeade (born 26 July 1997) is an English actress.

Early life
Born in Chichester, West Sussex, Bodimeade was a pupil at Stonar School in Wiltshire.

Career
Bodimeade starred in her first lead role as Maddy in the BAFTA-nominated BBC TV drama Summerhill, about the radical school of the same name.

She went on to appear as Megan in two seasons of the CBBC TV series "Paradise Cafe" filmed in New Zealand and the Cook Islands. She has also played lead roles in two BBC Radio 4 drama productions.

Filmography

Television

Film

Radio

References

External links
 

1997 births
Living people
English child actresses
People educated at Stonar School
English radio actresses
English television actresses
National Youth Theatre members